Scundu is a commune located in Vâlcea County, Oltenia, Romania. It is composed of four villages: Avrămești, Blejani, Crângu and Scundu.

References

Communes in Vâlcea County
Localities in Oltenia